Carboquone is a drug used in chemotherapy.

References

See also 
Chemotherapy
Aziridine

Aziridines
Carbamates
Alkylating antineoplastic agents
Ethers
1,4-Benzoquinones